Resham Lal Chaudhary, also Resham Chaudhary, is a Nepali former member of Parliament who has been sentenced to life in prison for his role in orchestrating and carrying out the 2015 Tikapur massacre. He is currently serving his sentence.

Role in 2015 Tikapur massacre
Resham Chaudhary was one of the principal leaders of a series of protests in Kailali opposing the proposed administrative demarcations in the new constitution. On August 24, the protest unexpectedly turned into a lynch mob targeting police personnel throughout the city. Seven police officers were killed. The attacks were carried out by people wielding household weapons. One of the victims was burned alive. A toddler, aged two, was also killed in the violence.
The police filed murder and other charges against more than 50 people naming Resham Chaudhary as the main accused. He denied the charges and went into hiding.

Member of the House of Representatives
In the 2017 elections, he was fielded by Rastriya Janata Party Nepal from Kailali-1 constituency. He registered his candidacy via proxy while still in hiding. He was elected by an overwhelming majority. He received 34,341 votes, beating his nearest rival by about 19,000 votes. He got 34,341 votes where his nearest rival received 13,406 . Following the election, he surrendered himself to the Kailali District Court on 26 February 2018. He was sworn into office nearly a year later, on 3 January 2019.
He served as a legislator until 7 March 2019 when he became automatically disqualified from office by constitutional provision that bars convicted criminals from serving as a member of the House of Representatives. He was in judicial custody for the duration of his office and therefore did not take part in any of the legislative proceedings.

Conviction and sentence
On 6 March 2019, he was sentenced to life imprisonment by Kailali District Court, along with 10 other accused, for his role in the Tikapur massacre. He immediately began serving his sentence following the conviction. His party withdrew its support to the government following his conviction.

References

Living people
Rastriya Janata Party Nepal politicians
Nepalese politicians convicted of crimes
Year of birth missing (living people)
Nepal MPs 2017–2022
Nagrik Unmukti Party politicians